, lit. The Great Peace Prayer Tower, is a cenotaph tower in Tondabayashi, Osaka, Japan.

General 
The official name of the cenotaph tower is literally . The tower is 180 m in height, white in color, and built by the Church of Perfect Liberty in August 1970. The tower was built by Tokyu Construction.

The cenotaph is dedicated to the souls of all war victims in history, regardless of race, ethnic group, sovereign state, border, region, religion, religious denomination and creed. The cenotaph is also used as a tomb for unidentified war victims.  A ceremony and memorial service, where participants pray for world peace, is held annually on 1 August.

See also 
 Chidorigafuchi National Cemetery
 Ryozen Kannon
 Sekai Mumei Senshi no Haka
 Church of Perfect Liberty

References

External links 

 超宗派万国戦争犠牲者慰霊大平和祈念塔 (in Japanese)

Cemeteries in Japan
Buildings and structures in Osaka Prefecture
Burial monuments and structures
Towers in Japan
Military monuments and memorials
Cenotaphs in Japan
Towers completed in 1970
Monuments and memorials in Japan
Tourist attractions in Osaka Prefecture
Visionary environments
1970 establishments in Japan
Tondabayashi, Osaka